Isabella Amara (born October 9, 1998) is an American actress and singer. She gained attention for her role as Sally Avril in the films Spider-Man: Homecoming (2017) and Avengers: Infinity War (2018). She also became known for her roles in the films Wilson (2017) and The Tale (2018), as well as the television series Queen America (2018–2019), and recently in Euphoria as Luna.

Career
Amara gained an interest in entertainment at an early age doing community theatre.  Since then she has made minor appearance in major films such as Joyful Noise, Barely Lethal and Middle School: The Worst Years of My Life.  She appeared in a supporting role in The Boss as teenage Michelle Darnell (portrayed by Melissa McCarthy).

In 2017, she appeared in the comedy-drama film Wilson, portraying the daughter of Woody Harrelson and Laura Dern's characters, and played Sally Avril in the Marvel Studios production Spider-Man: Homecoming. She reprised the latter role in Avengers: Infinity War (2018).

In 2022, she appeared as Luna in the last two episodes of the second season of the teen drama series Euphoria.

Filmography

Film

Television

References

External links
 
 

Living people
21st-century American actresses
1998 births
Actresses from Atlanta